Părău is a commune in Brașov County, Transylvania, Romania. It is composed of four villages: Grid, Părău, Veneția de Jos (Untervenitze; Alsóvenice), and Veneția de Sus (Felsővenice).

The commune is situated in the center of the county, in the historic Țara Făgărașului region. It lies on the left bank of the Olt River. The river Veneția discharges into the Olt near Veneția de Jos, while the river Părău flows into the Olt near the village Părău.

Părău is crossed by the national road , which runs from Șercaia to Hoghiz.

Natives
Dimitrie Eustatievici (1730–1796), philologist, scholar, and pedagogue

References

Communes in Brașov County
Localities in Transylvania